Daia is a commune in Giurgiu County, Romania

It may also refer to:

Places in Romania
 Daia (formerly Daia Secuiască), a village in Ulieș Commune, Harghita County
 Daia (formerly Sas-Daia), a village in Apold Commune, Mureș County
 Daia, a village in Bahnea Commune, Mureș County
 Daia (formerly Daia Săsească), a village in Roșia Commune, Sibiu County
 Daia Română, a commune in Alba County
 Daia, a tributary of the Hârtibaciu in Sibiu County
 Daia (Homorod), a tributary of the Homorodul Mare in Harghita County
 Daia (Secaș), in Alba County
 Daia, a tributary of the Târnava Mare in Mureș County

People
 Maximinus II, also known as Maximinus Daia
 Daïa, 11th century Muslim saint

Other 
 Delegación de Asociaciones Israelitas Argentinas, umbrella organization of Argentina's Jewish community, usually shortened as DAIA